Larry H. Miller Field is a stadium in Provo, Utah, United States. The field is named for businessman Larry H. Miller, the field is primarily used for baseball and is part of the Larry H. Miller Sports Complex. The ballpark has a capacity of 2,204 people and was opened in 2001. Larry H. Miller Field was previously the home of Provo Angels. It currently hosts the BYU Cougars baseball team. In 2012, college baseball writer Eric Sorenson ranked the field as the second-best setting and second-most underrated venue in NCAA Division I baseball.

A 20-foot by 50-foot video board was installed in 2022.

See also
 List of NCAA Division I baseball venues

References

BYU Cougars baseball
Brigham Young University buildings
College baseball venues in the United States
Minor league baseball venues
Sports venues in Utah County, Utah
Sports venues completed in 2001
2001 establishments in Utah